Notepad+ is a freeware text editor for Windows operating systems and is intended as a replacement for the Notepad editor installed by default on Windows.   It has more formatting features but, like Notepad, works only with plain text.  It can open text files of any size, and a single instance of the program can have multiple files open simultaneously.  It supports dragging and dropping text within a file and between files, and supports multiple fonts and colours.

Notepad+ is available from the company RogSoft. It was developed by Dutch programmer Rogier Meurs.  It was first released in 1996.  Originally, it had the advantage of being able to open files of any size, because until 2000 Notepad could not open files larger than 64 KB.

See also 
 Notepad++
 List of text editors
 Comparison of text editors

References

External links
RogSoft Homepage (Internet Archive)

Windows text editors
Notepad replacements
Freeware